A flip mirror unit is used on  quite astronomical Telescope and other thermal instruments in order to send the light from an object in new directions using a small mirror which can be moved into the lightbeam. It is a mirror-diagonal that holds both a camera and an eyepiece and allows you to switch your view between them by flipping a Mirror up or down. It is used to center the object in your camera and to help you focus it. It can also be used in 35-mm photography if it is large enough to allow the entire field of view to reach the camera.

In the case of a CCD camera, the flip mirror system works to let the viewer see exactly what the camera will see. In this setup, the flip mirror is used as an accessory that helps to aim and focus. The device is inserted into the telescope drawtube just before the CCD camera. Operated through a small lever, the mirror can direct the light at right angles into a viewing piece when actuated "up" or free the light from the telescope to pass into the CCD camera when it is flipped "down".

There are instances when a flip prism as an alternative to the flip mirror.

References

Optical telescope components